Thondarampet East is a village in the Orathanadu taluk of Thanjavur district, Tamil Nadu, India.

Demographics 

As per the 2001 census, Thondarampet East had a total population of 1595 with 728 males and 867 females. The sex ratio was 1191. The literacy rate was 62.91.

References 

 

Villages in Thanjavur district